HSC Jaume II  is a high speed catamaran built in 1996 by Incat in Tasmania, Australia.

History
Jaume II was built in 1996 as Condor 12. For her first season she operated alongside Condor 10 on Condor Ferries Channel Island services. In 1997 the vessel became Holyman Rapide and operated on the English Channel. When Hoverspeed bought the Holyman, the Holyman Rapide became known as Rapide and transferred to Hoverspeed's English Channel Routes.

In March 2001 Rapide moved up from the English Channel to Sea Containers Irish Sea services between Liverpool and Dublin, Liverpool and Douglas.

For March 2002 the Rapide was deployed between Belfast and Heysham and services to/from the Isle of Man, until a disastrous fire on Wednesday 21 August 2002 on the 0700 service. A fire was reported in the Port Engine room at 0800. The vessel was forced to turn back to Belfast and passengers were offered alternative travel arrangements. The service never reopened after that date.

The Rapide lay alongside the lay-up berth in Belfast before finally getting repaired by March 2003. With Seacat Scotland moving to the English Channel in November 2002, this meant the Belfast to Troon route needed a vessel, as it had been operated by SeaCat Isle of Man, which needed to return to her Manx services.

On Monday 1 November 2004 Rapide had completed the Belfast to Troon service with the 1545 sailing ex Belfast returning from Troon at 1930, she also occasionally covered Manx routes. Finally, the Rapide left Belfast for the final time on Monday 8 November 2004 at 1620, bound for Sunderland.

For 2005 Rapide was deployed, as Seacat Rapide, between Dover and Calais for Hoverspeed, however as the Company closed on Monday 7 November 2005 the Rapide was laid up at Tilbury.

In June 2006 Rapide left the channel probably for the last time bound for a new career in the Mediterranean with the Spanish shipping company Baleària, renamed Jaume II.

In February 2016 four new main engines were fitted at the Astilleros del Guadalquivir shipyard in Seville, to reduce fuel consumption and NOx emissions and to increase speed. At the same time the interior areas of the ship were upgraded and modernised.

, Jaume II operates as a high speed ferry between Fort Lauderdale, Florida, US, and Grand Bahama and Bimini in the Bahamas.

See also
SeaCat
Incat
High-speed craft

External links

References

Ferries of Spain
Ships built by Incat
Incat high-speed craft
1996 ships